New American Saint is the second album by indie rock, pop punk, New Jersey based United States group, Tokyo Rose. The record was released by Sidecho Records on October 4, 2005.  The album quietly strays away from the more punk-ish sound brought by previous effort, Reinventing a Lost Art.

Video
Tokyo Rose recorded a video for the first track on the album, "Spectacle". The video was directed by Daniel Yourd at Endeavormedia. The band also appeared on MTVU's, The Freshmen, talking about the record and the video for "Spectacle".

Track listing 
  Spectacle (3:38)
  New American Saint (3:26)
  Goodbye Almond Eyes (4:03)
  The Tin Man Gets His Heart (4:45)
  Treading Water (4:35)
  Bottle Marked: Caution (3:38)
  The Hard Eight (3:24)
  A Reason to Come Home Again (3:23)
  I Love You... Too (3:59)
  The Hammer and the Nail (4:03)
  Meghan Again (3:32)

References

External links
 Ryan Dominguez discussing the lyric writing process for each track (Archived 2012 by WayBackMachine)
 Purchase New American Saint at Amazon.com
 Watch Spectacle on Youtube.com

Tokyo Rose (band) albums
2005 albums